Gordon Hookey (born 1961 Cloncurry) is an Australian aboriginal artist from the Waanyi people. He has a Bachelor of Fine Arts (1992) and lives in Brisbane, Australia. He is primarily known as a painter but his practice also involves sculpture, installation, drawing, photography, and to a lesser extent, animation.

Hookey is a core member of the Brisbane-based Indigenous collective proppaNOW.

Hookey has been exhibited in the Sydney Biennale with Paranoia Annoy Ya. He had an exhibition called Ruddock's Wheel, which made fun of a comment by Philip Ruddock who said that aborigines had not used the wheel.

In 2018 Gordon Hookey was interviewed in a digital story and oral history for the State Library of Queensland's James C Sourris AM Collection. In the interview Hookey talks to Bruce McLean, Curator of Indigenous Australian Art at the Queensland Gallery of Modern Art about his life, his inspirations and the meanings of his works.

References

External links
Gordon Hookey
Gordon Hookey interviewed by Bruce McLean : James C. Sourris Artist Interview Series 2017-2018. John Oxley Library, State Library of Queensland, 5 May 2018. 8.23min, 33min and 2:38 hour version available to view online.
Portrait of an artist: Gordon Hookey. Portrait of an Artist is an in conversation event series by the State Library of Queensland.
DAAO Biography of Gordon Hookey
National Gallery of Victoria Biography Page
Gordon Hookey portraits, State Library of Queensland

1961 births
Living people
Australian Aboriginal artists
People from Cloncurry, Queensland